John Seeley may refer to:

John Seeley (Steuben County, NY) (1872–1932), New York physician and state senator
John E. Seeley (1810–1875), U.S. Representative from New York
Sir John Robert Seeley (1834–1895), English essayist and historian
John Ronald Seeley (1913–2007), sociologist and author

See also
John Edward Bernard Seely (1868-1947), British soldier and politician